John Petersburg (born April 8, 1952) is an American politician serving in the Minnesota House of Representatives since 2013. A member of the Republican Party of Minnesota, Petersburg represents District 19B in southeast-central Minnesota, including the cities of Owatonna and Waseca and parts of Steele and Waseca Counties.

Early life, education and career
Petersburg was born in Owatonna, Minnesota and attended Claremont High School. He attended Minnesota State University, Mankato, graduating with a B.S. in public administration and a B.S. in paralegal studies. Petersburg was a church administrator at Trinity Lutheran Church in Owatonna for 21 years. He served on the Dodge Center School Board during the 1980s and '90s.

Minnesota House of Representatives
Petersburg was elected to the Minnesota House of Representatives in 2012, following redistricting and the retirement of incumbent Kory Kath, and has been elected every two years since.

In 2017-18, Petersburg served as vice-chair of the Transportation Finance Committee. He is the minority lead on the Transportation Finance and Policy Committee and sits on the Housing Finance and Policy and Ways and Means Committees.

Electoral history

Personal life
Petersburg is married to his wife, Susan. They have eight children and reside in Waseca, Minnesota.

References

External links

Rep. John Petersburg official Minnesota House of Representatives website
Rep. John Petersburg official campaign website

1952 births
Living people
Republican Party members of the Minnesota House of Representatives
21st-century American politicians
People from Waseca, Minnesota
Minnesota State University, Mankato alumni